WTBF (970 AM) is a radio station broadcasting a sports format. Licensed to Troy, Alabama, United States, the station is currently owned by Troy Broadcasting Corp. and features programming from CBS Sports Radio.

History of Troy Broadcasting Corporation
WTBF began broadcasting in 1947.  A classic example of a small town station, they played a wide variety of music during the day, from MOR to country music, even with an occasional Talk program.

WTBF signed on at 12 noon on February 25, 1947, with the roll of the timpani leading into "The Star-Spangled Banner", played by the Troy High School Band.  That drum roll was played by the future Mrs. Ann Gilchrist (wife of owner Joe Gilchrist). The station was then signed on for the very first time by Samuel F. (Sam) Townsend, who in 1949 purchased AM radio station WCNU in Crestview, Florida and relocated there.  The original calls were to be WTBC, for Troy Broadcasting Corporation, but those letters were already taken, so they settled on WTBF. 
  
For the first few years, WTBF was at 1490 on the dial, then moved down to 970 during the 1950s.  Bob "Pappy" Tolbert, Jess Jordan, and Joe Gilchrist did wild morning shows before the genre was invented.  Joe interviewed pigs who lived at the transmitter site; Pappy gave away junk records with crazy trivia questions.  Birthdays, anniversaries, giveaways, obituaries, weather, local news (bake sales, gospel sings, barbecues, yard sales, etc.) are part of the Morning Show to this very day.

On July 16, 1969, Joe Gilchrist did a live remote of the Apollo 11 launch from Cape Canaveral.

The original tower was over 300 feet tall and was located directly behind the station.  It is now owned by a radio station in Puerto Rico.

The AM still uses its original audio processor, which has only been disconnected one time—when locations changed.

WTBF programming through the years
At night, the programming targeted teens and college students. By 1970, the tempo was more Top 40 feeling with MOR music.  From 1973 to 1978, the station played country during the day.  From 1978 to 1985, it was all AC during the day. From 1985 to 1988, they went back to a hodgepodge of music.  All during these periods, WTBF was still Top 40 at night, and some during the weekends.  At night the program was called "Night Flight".  In 1988, the late night AC stopped and WTBF went country all the way.

In October 1994, WTBF made an unusual move and started "Night Visions", a modern rock program airing at 8pm on weeknights. That became a revival of "Night Flight" by 1996; it lasted until 2003. There was a night of R&B and Blues, 70s music, 80s music, jazz, classic rock and even contemporary Christian.  This interesting arrangement continued off and on, between 1998 and 2000, before ending altogether.

On January 13, 2015, WTBF changed their format from talk/personality to sports, with programming from CBS Sports Radio.

References

External links

TBF
Sports radio stations in the United States
Radio stations established in 1947
1947 establishments in Alabama